John A. Stevens (born May 4, 1966) is a Canadian professional ice hockey coach and former player. He is an assistant coach of the Vegas Golden Knights. He is the former head coach of the Los Angeles Kings and the Philadelphia Flyers of the National Hockey League (NHL). Stevens was a defenceman for the Flyers and Hartford Whalers during his playing career. Stevens was born in Campbellton, New Brunswick, but grew up in Turkey Point in Norfolk County, Ontario.

Playing career
Stevens was drafted by the Philadelphia Flyers in the third round, 47th overall, of the 1984 NHL Entry Draft. Stevens followed up a junior career with the Oshawa Generals in the Ontario Hockey League (OHL) by playing four seasons for the Hershey Bears of the AHL. He was called up to the NHL level at times during the 1986–87 and 1987–88 seasons, playing in a total of 9 games with the Flyers. He was signed by the Hartford Whalers in 1990 and reassigned to the Whalers' AHL team, the Springfield Indians. Stevens was named team captain that year and went on to win the Calder Cup with the team that same year for the franchise's seventh Championship title. With the Indians' franchise moving to Worcester, Massachusetts in 1994, Stevens became the first captain of the successor franchise, the Springfield Falcons, where he played for two additional years.

In 1996, Stevens signed once more with the Flyers, and was named the first captain of its expansion farm team, the Philadelphia Phantoms. The Phantoms won their first Calder Cup in his second season as captain.

Stevens played in 53 NHL games for the Flyers and the Whalers scoring no goals, ten assists and recording 48 penalty minutes. In the AHL, he played in 834 games, scoring 20 goals and 166 assists for 186 points. Ironically, given his low scoring output as a defensive defenceman, Stevens scored the first goals in franchise history for both the Falcons and the Phantoms.

Coaching career
Stevens was forced to retire as a player in 1999 due to a career-ending eye injury, but remained with the Phantoms as an assistant coach. He then became the club's second head coach in 2000 when Bill Barber was promoted to the Flyers. During his six-season tenure as coach, the Phantoms made the playoffs four times and won their second Calder Cup title in 2005. Stevens was himself promoted to the Phantoms' parent club as an assistant coach after the 2005–06 season, and on October 22, 2006, was named as head coach of the Philadelphia Flyers after Ken Hitchcock was fired. On October 26, Stevens coached his first NHL game, a 3–2 win over the Florida Panthers. On November 20, the Flyers announced that they had signed Stevens to a 2-year contract.

His first season with the Flyers saw his team set a franchise record for consecutive losses (10 games) and finish the 2006–07 season with the club's worst record in its 40-year history. The Flyers set an NHL record for the biggest drop off in points from one season to the next – 101 points in the 2005–06 season to 56 points in the 2006–07 season for lowest point total in the league.

However, as stunning as their fall from grace was the previous season, Stevens guided the Flyers to an immediate renaissance in 2007–08. The Flyers won 42 games and amassed 95 points in the regular season under Stevens's guidance. In the playoffs, the Flyers beat the Washington Capitals in the first round and upset the top-seeded Montreal Canadiens in the second round before falling to the Pittsburgh Penguins in the Eastern Conference Finals. For this, The Hockey News honored Stevens with their Coach of the Year award.

Stevens was fired by the Flyers on December 4, 2009, after a 13–11–1 start and with a team expected to be a Stanley Cup favorite sitting in 10th place in the Eastern Conference.

On June 24, 2010, he was signed to a three-year contract to be an assistant coach for the Los Angeles Kings, joining former Flyers coach Terry Murray as well as former Flyers player Ron Hextall in the Kings organization.

During the 2011–12 season, after Kings coach Terry Murray was fired, Stevens acted as interim head coach for 4 games before Darryl Sutter took over. He then returned to his post as Assistant Coach, a position he held when the Kings won their first Stanley Cup in franchise history at the season's end. The Kings again won the Stanley Cup in 2014 with Stevens as an assistant behind the bench.

On June 18, 2014, he re-signed with Kings and was promoted to associate head coach.

On April 23, 2017, Stevens was named the head coach of the Los Angeles Kings. In his first season as the head coach of the Kings, he guided the Kings back to the playoffs as the first wild card in the Western Conference, but they were swept by the Vegas Golden Knights in the first round. On November 4, 2018, the Kings fired Stevens after a 4–8–1 start to the 2018–19 season.

He later became Assistant Coach for the Dallas Stars, a position he left on May 20, 2022. He later joined the coaching staff of the Vegas Golden Knights, as an assistant coach, which was announced on June 28, 2022.

Personal life
Stevens grew up in the lakeside village of Turkey Point, Ontario. His three brothers also played hockey, and his brother Larry Stevens played briefly with the Sudbury Wolves of the Ontario Hockey League.

Stevens has two sons who also play hockey. His eldest son, also named John, played high school hockey for Salisbury School in Connecticut and one season with the Dubuque Fighting Saints in the United States Hockey League (USHL) before playing college hockey for the Northeastern University Huskies hockey team. John Jr. signed with the New York Islanders of the NHL after finishing his college career and is currently playing on their AHL affiliate team, the Bridgeport Sound Tigers. John's younger son, Nolan Stevens, played for the US National Development Team in the USHL, before joining his brother at Northeastern. Nolan was drafted in the 5th round, 125th overall of the 2016 NHL Entry Draft by the St. Louis Blues. Stevens resides in Sea Isle City, New Jersey in the summer.

Career statistics

Coaching record

NHL

AHL

Awards and records

Awards
Player
 Calder Cup champion (1988, 1991, 1998)
 AHL All-Star Game (1996)

Coach
 2005 – Calder Cup champion (2005)
 2007 – Philadelphia Phantoms Hall of Fame inductee
 2008 – The Hockey News Coach of the Year
 2012 - Stanley Cup champion (2012, 2014)

Records
Player
 Scored first goal in Springfield Falcons history (1994)
 Scored first goal in Philadelphia Phantoms history (1996)

Coach
 Worst season record in Philadelphia Flyers history (21–42–11 in 2006–07)
 NHL record for the biggest drop off in points from one season to the next (101 points in the 2005–06 season to 56 points in the 2006–07 season)

References

External links
 

1966 births
Canadian ice hockey defencemen
Hartford Whalers players
Hershey Bears players
Ice hockey people from New Brunswick
Ice hockey people from Ontario
Kalamazoo Wings (1974–2000) players
Living people
Los Angeles Kings coaches
Oshawa Generals players
People from Caledon, Ontario
People from Campbellton, New Brunswick
People from Sea Isle City, New Jersey
Philadelphia Flyers coaches
Philadelphia Flyers draft picks
Philadelphia Flyers players
Philadelphia Phantoms players
Springfield Falcons players
Springfield Indians players
Stanley Cup champions
Vegas Golden Knights coaches
Canadian ice hockey coaches